Geoff Nelder is a British freelance editor and author. He has written both fiction and non-fiction, and his research in the field of air pollution and climate won him a fellowship with the Royal Meteorological Society. Nelder's fictional work falls in the genres of science fiction, fantasy and thrillers, and he is known for his sci-fi series ARIA, which won him a Preditors & Editors Award for best science fiction novel. Nelder also published the sci-fi magazine Escape Velocity, which launched in 2009. Prior to moving to writing as his primary occupation, Nelder has worked as a teacher at Queens Park High School for 26 years.

In 1975 Nelder became a life member of the British Vegan Society.
In 2009 Nelder became a publisher for BeWrite Books, an independent publisher.

Awards
Fellow of the Royal Meteorological Society, Master of Science (Sheffield), Bachelor of Education 
Preditors & Editors Award for best science fiction novel (ARIA: Left Luggage) (2013, won)

Bibliography

ARIA
Left Luggage (2012, LL-Publications)
Returning Left Luggage (2013, LL-Publications)
Abandoned Luggage (TBA)

Fiction
Escaping Reality (2005, Brambling Books)
Dimensions, a sci-fi anthology with Robert Blevins (2006, Adventure Books of Seattle)
Exit, Pursued by a Bee (2008, Double Dragon Publishing)
Hot Air (2011, Adventure Books of Seattle)
Escape Velocity - The Anthology, anthology with Robert Blevins (2011, Adventure Books of Seattle)
ARIA Trilogy - Left Luggage; Returning Left Luggage; Abandoned Left Luggage (2012 - 2015, LL-Publishing)
The Chaos of Mokii (2016, Solstice Publishing)  
Xaghra's Revenge (2018, Solstice Publishing)Incremental a collection of 25 surreal, mostly scifi short stories (2018, LL-Publishing)
Suppose We first in the Flying Crooked scifi series. Vegan protagonist on a vegan planet (2019, LL-Publishing)

Non-fiction
Huddersfield's Changing Climate (1977) 
Chester's Climate: past and present (1987) Republished with updates (2017)
Cheshire from Space remote sensing pack (1992, as project manager with Keith Hilton)
Inside Scoop (2008)
How to Win Short Story Competitions Second edition (2018) co-written with Dave Haslett

References

External links
 
 
 

British alternative history writers
British science fiction writers
Living people
Year of birth missing (living people)